Musical compositions of the composer Thomas de Hartmann (1884–1956).

Orchestral 
Suite from “La Fleurette rouge”. (1911)
Scherzo fantastique. Op. 25. (1929)
Two Organ Fugues of Bach transcribed for Orchestra. Op. 48. (1934)
First Symphonie-Poème. Op. 50. (1934)
Concerto for Violoncello and Orchestra. Op. 57. (c. 1936, published 1938)
Twelve Russian Fairy Tales. Op. 58. (1937)
Koliadky. Noëls ukrainiens, chant spiritual. Op. 60. (c. 1938)
Concerto for Piano and Orchestra. Op. 61. (1939)
Suite pour grand orchestre: Une Fête en Ukraine. Op. 62. (1941)
Fantasie-concerto for Contrabass and Orchestra. Op. 65. (1944)
Concerto for Violin and Orchestra. Op. 66. (1944)
Second Symphonie-Poème – Le dit du soleil. Op. 68. (1950)
“La Guzla” – Concerto for Harp and Orchestra. Rapsodie slave d’après P. Merimé. Op. 72. (1945)
Concerto d’après un cantate de Bach. For Violoncello and String Orchestra. Op. 73. (1949)
Dances from the opera Esther. Op. 76. (1949)
Concierto Andaluz, for Flute and Orchestra. Op. 81. (1949)
Third Symphonie-Poème. Op. 85. (1953)
Fourth Symphonie-Poème. Unfinished. Op. 90. (1956)

Chamber and instrumental music 
Sonate pour violon et piano. Op. 51. (1935)
Concerto for Violoncello and Orchestra. Arrangement for Violoncello and Piano. Op. 57. (1936)
Koliadky. Noëls ukrainiens, chant spiritual. Arrangement for Saxophone Quartet. Op. 60. (c. 1938)
Concerto for Piano and Orchestra. Arrangement for Two Pianos. Op. 61. (1939)
Sonate pour violoncelle et piano. Op. 63. (1941)
Deux Pleureuses. Violin and Piano. Op. 64 (c. 1942)
Fantasie-concerto for Contrabass and Orchestra. Arrangement for Contrabass and Piano. Op. 65. (1944)
Concerto for Violin and Orchestra. Arrangement for Violin and Piano. Op. 66. (1944)
La Guzla: Concerto for Harp and Orchestra. Rapsodie slave d’après P. Merimé. Arrangement for Harp and Piano. Op. 72. (1945)
Concerto d’après un cantate de Bach. Arrangement for Violoncello and Piano. Op. 73. (1945)
Trio pour flute, violon et piano – “Quasi variations.” Op. 75. (1946)
Two Preludes of J.S. Bach. Cello and piano. (1947)
Dances from the opera Esther. Arrangement for Violin and Piano. Op. 76. (1949)
Concierto Andaluz, for Flute and Orchestra. Arrangement for Flute and Piano. Op. 81. (1949)
La Kobsa: deux musiques de veilleurs ukrainiens pour violoncelle solo. (1950)

Music for stage works 

Incidental music for the play “Caligula,” by Alexander Dumas. For Orchestra. (1903)
La Fleurette rouge, ballet en cinq actes. Op. 9. (1906)
Les Bacchantes, Choreographic Suite for “Danses Plastique” performed by Sacharoff. (1910)
Fra Mino. Choreographic poem. Op. 14. (1912)
Gelbe Klang [Yellow Sound], with Wassily Kandinsky. Unfinished. (1912)
Forces de l’amour et de la sorcellerie, divertissement comique en trois interludes. Op. 16. (1916)
Flenushka. Unfinished opera. (1916)
Music for the drama “In the Grip of Life,” by Knut Hamson. Tiflis Art Theater. Op. 22. (1919)
Music for “The King of the Dark Chamber,” by Rabindranath Tagore. Tiflis. Op. 23. (1919)
Le General Boulanger, d’après Maurice Rostand. Unfinished. (c. 1931)
Babette, comédie-ballet en deux actes par Henri Cain. Op. 49 (1935)
Suite pour grand orchestre: Une Fête en Ukraine, ballet en un acte. Op. 62. (1941)
Esther, tragédie musicale d’après Racine. Opera. Op. 76. (1949)
Musique pour la fête de la Patronne, d’après Degas. Ballet. Op. 77. (1949)

Piano Solo 
Sonata for Piano. Op. 2. (1902)
Trois Morceaux. Op. 4. (c. 1903)
Six Pieces. Op. 7. (c. 1903)
Three Preludes. Op. 9. (1904)
La Fleurette rouge. Reduction for Piano Solo. Op. 9. (1906)
Suite from “La Fleurette rouge”. Arranged for Piano Solo. (1911)
Fra Mino. Selections. Reduction for Piano Solo. Op. 14. (1912)
Forces de l’amour et de la sorcellerie. Reduction for Piano Solo. Op. 16. (1917)
Humoresque Viennoise. Op. 45. (1931)
Babette, comédie-ballet en deux actes par Henri Cain. Arranged for Piano Solo. Op. 49 (1935)
Twelve Russian Fairy Tales. Version for Piano Solo. Op. 58. (1937)
Koliadky. Version for Piano Solo. Op. 60. (c. 1940)
First Piano Sonata. Op. 67. (1942)
Lumière noire. Op. 74. (1948)
Musique pour la fête de la Patronne, d’après Degas. Reduction for Piano Solo. Op. 77. (1949)
Second Piano Sonata. Op. 82. (1951)
Six Preludes. Op. 83. (1952)
Two Nocturnes. Op. 84. (1954)
Four Serenades. Op. 86. (1954)
Three Songs. Under pseudonym of Thomas Kross. (c. 1955)
Poco Rubato. Piano solo. n.d.

Vocal 
Romance. Words by Tatiana Shchepkina-Kupernik. Voice and Piano. (1901)
Three Romances. Words by Pyotr Kapnist and Mikhail Golenischev-Kutusov. Op. 5. Voice and Piano. (c. 1903)
Mermaids. Words by B. Kakhovsky. Op. 5. Voice and Piano. (c. 1903)
Four Poems of K. Balmont. Op. 8. Voice and Piano. (c. 1904)
John of Damascus, cantata for soloists, mixed choir and symphony orchestra. Text based on the poem by A. K. Tolstoy. Op. 1. (1906)
From the Verses of D.M. Ausonius. Op. 13. Voice and Orchestra. Also arranged for Voice and Piano. (1911)
Three Songs of Balmont. Op. 12. Voice and Piano. (1912)
Three Moorish Songs. Translated by Konstantin Balmont. Op. 15. Voice and Piano. (1913)
Four Melodies. Words by Anna Achmatova. Op. 17. Voice and Piano. (1915)<Reproduced manuscript in Montreal collection</ref>
Christ is Risen. Words by Sergei Gorodetsky. Op. 18. Voice and Piano. (1915)
Two Spanish Songs. Words by Valery Bryusov. Op. 19. Voice and Piano. (1916)
To the moon. Words by Shelley. Op. 11. Voice and Piano. (1917)
Nightingale. Voice and Orchestra. (c. 1919)
Cranes. Words by Vassily Zota. Voice and Piano. (1920)
Bulgarian Songs. Translated by Konstantin Balmont. Op. 46. Voice and Piano. (1933)
Three Ballads. Words by G. Adamovich and Maria Tsvetaeva. Op. 47. Voice and Piano. (1934)
Lament for King Alexander. Voice and Piano. (1934)
Three Poems of Shelley. Op. 52. Voice and Orchestra. Also arranged for Voice and Piano. (1936)
Sonnet de Ronsard. Op. 54. Voice and Piano. (1934)
Romance 1830. Op. 55. Voice and Piano. (1936)
In Helen’s Herb Garden. Words by Vassilli Travnikov. Voice and Piano. (1936)
A Poet’s Love: Nine Poems by Pushkin. Op. 59. Voice and Piano. (1936)
Indian Summer. Words by Don Aminado. Voice and Piano. (1938)
Sept Paysages Tristes. Words by Paul Verlaine. Op. 69. Voice and Piano. (1943)
Two Songs. Words by Fyodor Sologub and William Shakespeare. Voice and Piano. (c. 1943)
Fragment of Proust. Op. 70. Voice and Piano. (1945)
Six Commentaries from Ulysses by James Joyce. Op. 71. Voice and Piano. (1948)
Second Fragment of Proust. Op. 79. Voice and Piano. (1948)
Les Courbes d’Atalante: Déclamation avec musique d’Harpe. Words by Serge Moreux. (1949)
La Tramuntana. Words by J. Gual. Op. 80. For a cappella choir. (1949)
A la St. Jean d’été. Words by Serge Moreux and Thomas Kross (pseud.). Voice and Piano. (1949)
Frenchman in Arizona. Words and Music by Thomas Kross (pseud.). Voice and Piano. (1951)
The Song of the Dead Venetian. Words by Jean Loynel; Music: Thomas Kross (pseud.). Voice and Piano. (c. 1951)
The Barrel Organ Girl. Words by Maria Tsvetaeva. Voice and Piano. (c. 1954)
Four popular Russian songs. Men’s a cappella quartet. (n.d.)
In the Nocturnal Silence. Men’s a cappella quartet. (n.d.)
Twilight. Words by Luc Durtin. Voice and Piano. (n.d.)
Two Chinese Songs. Translated by George Soulié de Morant. Voice and Piano. (n.d.)
White flocks. Words by Anna Achmatova. Voice and Piano. (n.d.)

Collaborations with G.I. Gurdjieff 
The following volumes are all published by  Schott Music Group:
Gurdjieff/de Hartmann: Music for the Piano.
Volume I: Asian Songs and Rhythms
Volume II: Music of the Sayyids and the Dervishes
Volume III: Hymns, Prayers and Rituals
Volume IV: Hymns from a Great Temple and Other Selected Works

References

Sources 
Thomas de Hartmann papers, MSS 46, Irving S. Gilmore Music Library, Yale University.
Thomas de Hartmann collection, private collection in Montreal, Quebec, Canada.
Russian National Archive of Literature and Art, Moscow, Russia.
Bibliothèque Nationale de France catalogue
Schott Music Group

External links 
Thomas de Hartmann papers at Yale University Music Library
Catalogue of the Bibliothèque Nationale de France
Russian National Archives of Literature and Art
Schott Music Group

de Hartmann, Thomas